LGL may refer to:

Codes 
 LGL, the IATA airport code for Long Lellang Airport, Long Lellang, the state of Sarawak in Malaysia
 LGL, the ICAO airline code for Luxair, the flag carrier airline of Luxembourg
 lgl, the ISO 639-3 three-letter language code for Langalanga language

Science

Biology 
 Large granular lymphocyte, a type of white blood cell in the immune system
 Lown–Ganong–Levine syndrome, a heart disease when the ventricles are pre-excited due to abnormal electrical communication from the atria to the ventricles

Organizations 
 Lycée de Garçons de Luxembourg (Luxembourg Boys' High School), a high school in Luxembourg City, Luxembourg
 Lithuanian Gay League
 Ladies Gridiron League, an Australian-based non-for-profit company running a full contact, 7-a-side, women's American football league

Science and technology

Computing 
 Large Graph Layout (see), a set of applications to ease the visualization of large networks and graphs

Mathematics 
 Gauss–Lobatto–Legendre nodes (points) and weights

Companies 
 LGL Limited (see). A private research and consulting firm formed in 1971 and named after the company's three founding partners, A. Lewis, W.W.H. Gunn, and J.A. Livingston